Henry Josué Martín Mex (born 18 November 1992) is a Mexican professional footballer who plays as a forward for Liga MX club América and the Mexico national team.

Club career

Itzaes
At age 15, Martín played one season in the third division with Itzaes during the Clausura 2008 season. He made 13 league appearances and scored 6 goals.

Mérida
Martín began his professional career in 2013 with his home town club Mérida. He made his professional debut with the first team on 13 July 2013 against Delfines del Carmen, where he was subbed in for José Luis Pineda in the final seconds of the match. He scored his first league goal on 24 August against Zacatepec where the match ended 2–0.

Tijuana
Henry transferred to Tijuana for the Apertura 2014 season. He made his Liga MX debut with Tijuana against América on 26 July 2014, almost exactly one year after his career debut. He scored his first goal three days later in a Copa MX match against Zacatepec, where Tijuana won 3–1.

América
On 13 December 2017, Martín joined América, reuniting with former Tijuana coach Miguel Herrera. He also scored on his league debut with the club in a 1–0 away win against Querétaro on 7 January 2018. On 3 February, Martín scored his first career hat-trick in a 5–1 win over Lobos BUAP.

As América won the Clausura 2019 Copa MX final against Juárez, Martín finished as the tournament's top scorer with 5 goals.

International career
On 30 August 2015, Martín received his first call-up by interim head coach Ricardo Ferretti to replace the injured Oribe Peralta. He earned his first cap with Mexico on 4 September in a friendly match against Trinidad and Tobago, playing as starter and eventually subbed-out for Raúl Jiménez in the 59th minute of the match.

On 11 October 2018, Martín scored his first goal for Mexico in their 3–2 win over Costa Rica.

Martín was called up by Jaime Lozano as one of three over-age reinforcements for the 2020 Summer Olympics in Tokyo. He won the bronze medal with the Olympic team.

In October 2022, Martín was named in Mexico's preliminary 31-man squad for the 2022 FIFA World Cup, and in November, he was ultimately included in the final 26-man roster.

Personal life
Henry's older brother, Freddy, was also a professional footballer who played as a forward.

Career statistics

Club

International

International goals
Scores and results list Mexico's goal tally first.

Honours
América
Liga MX: Apertura 2018
Copa MX: Clausura 2019
Campeón de Campeones: 2019

Mexico Olympic
Olympic Bronze Medal: 2020

Individual
Copa MX Top Scorer: Clausura 2019
Liga MX Player of the Month: October 2019

References

External links
 
 Henry Martin at XOLO
 

1992 births
Living people
Footballers from Yucatán
Sportspeople from Mérida, Yucatán
C.F. Mérida footballers
Club Tijuana footballers
Club América footballers
Liga MX players
Mexico international footballers
Association football forwards
Mexican footballers
Footballers at the 2020 Summer Olympics
Olympic footballers of Mexico
Olympic medalists in football
Olympic bronze medalists for Mexico
Medalists at the 2020 Summer Olympics
2022 FIFA World Cup players